Tim Dunn is an American farmer and politician and a Republican member of the Arizona House of Representatives representing District 25 since January 9, 2023. He previously represented District 13 from 2018 to 2023. Dunn was appointed to replace expelled representative Don Shooter. Dunn is a farmer in Yuma, Arizona where his business, Dunn Grain Co. Inc., specializes in selling grain seeds. Dunn has suggested (in Congress) a pipeline transferring water from the Mississippi River to the Colorado River.

References

Year of birth missing (living people)
Living people
Republican Party members of the Arizona House of Representatives
21st-century American politicians